Germanium(IV) nitride is an inorganic compound with the chemical formula Ge3N4. It can be produced through the reaction of germanium and ammonia:

3 Ge + 4 NH3 → Ge3N4 + 6 H2

Structure 
In its pure state, germanium(IV) nitride is a colorless, inert solid that crystallizes in many polymorphs, of which the most stable is the trigonal β-form (space group P31c). In this structure, the germanium atoms are tetrahedrally coordinated while the nitrogen atoms are trigonal planar. The γ-form, which forms under high pressure, has a spinel structure.

References

Germanium(IV) compounds
Nitrides